Thomas Benet (died 1531) from Cambridge, was an English Protestant martyr during the reign of King Henry VIII. In 1524, he moved to Torrington, North Devon, with his wife and family so that he could exercise his religious conscience more freely in a county where no one knew him. He was executed by burning on 15 January 1531, for heresy, at Livery Dole outside Exeter in Devon, under the supervision of Sir Thomas Dennis (c.1477-1561) of Holcombe Burnell, near Exeter, then Sheriff of Devon. (Nicholas Orme states that the posting of documents on and around Exeter Cathedral for which Benet was condemned took place in October 1530, and his execution consequently took place early the following year.)

He is said in Foxe's Book of Martyrs to have died with "his hands and eyes to heaven, saying 'Lord, receive my spirit!'". A memorial to him and his fellow martyr Agnes Prest, who was burned nearby for the same offence in 1557, was designed by Harry Hems and erected near the site of their martyrdom by public subscription in 1909.

Denmark Road Protestant Martyrs' Memorial

In 1909 a monument in the form of an obelisk of Dartmoor granite was erected to Benet's memory in Denmark Road, Exeter, near Livery Dole. This monument was designed by Harry Hems and was erected  with money raised through public subscription. It also commemorates the martyrdom of Agnes Prest who in 1557 was burnt for heresy at the stake in Southernhay. Two bronze sculpted relief panels by Harry Hems on the base of the obelisk depict Benet banging on the door of the Cathedral and Prest burning at the stake. The following inscriptions are  contained on two bronze plaques affixed on opposite sides of  the base:

In grateful remembrance of Thomas Benet, M.A. who suffered at Livery Dole A.D. 1531 for denying the supremacy of the Pope and of Agnes Prest who suffered on Southernhay A.D. 1557 for refusing to accept the doctrine of Transubstantiation. Faithful unto death.
 
And:

To the glory of God & in honour of his faithful witnesses who near this spot yielded their bodies to be burned for love to Christ and in vindication of the principles of the Protestant Reformation this monument was erected by public subscription AD 1909. They being dead yet speak.

References

Year of birth missing
1531 deaths
People from Cambridge
People executed under Henry VIII
People executed for heresy
Executed British people
16th-century Protestant martyrs
16th-century English people
Executed people from Cambridgeshire
People executed by the Kingdom of England by burning
Protestant martyrs of England